A number of gene mutations have been linked to conditions of or affecting the human integumentary system.

See also 
 List of radiographic findings associated with cutaneous conditions
 List of cutaneous conditions caused by mutations in keratins
 List of contact allergens
 List of histologic stains that aid in diagnosis of cutaneous conditions
 List of target antigens in pemphigus
 List of specialized glands within the human integumentary system
 List of cutaneous conditions associated with internal malignancy

References 

 
 

Cutaneous conditions
Dermatology-related lists
Mutated
Cutaneous conditions